Mid-term parliamentary elections were held in Costa Rica on 10 February 1946. The result was a victory for the Independent National Republican Party, which received 50.5% of the vote. Voter turnout was 64.3%. They were the last mid-term elections in the country's history.

Results

References

1946 elections in Central America
1946 in Costa Rica
Elections in Costa Rica